"We Are the People" is a song by Australian electronic music duo Empire of the Sun, released as the second single from their debut studio album, Walking on a Dream (2008). It was released in Australia on 20 September 2008 and debuted at number 85 on the ARIA Singles Chart before peaking at number 24 on 12 January 2009. It reached number one in Germany in December 2010.

Music video
The music video for the song, directed by Josh Logue, was shot in Mexico, and was inspired by the ancient Mexican festival Day of the Dead (Día de los Muertos). Locations included the surreal gardens of Sir Edward James at Las Pozas of Xilitla in the state of San Luis Potosí, Monterrey, Nuevo León and García, Nuevo León.

The Josh Logue of Mathematics directed music video was nominated for Best Video at the ARIA Music Awards of 2008.

Usage in media
The song has been used in media productions such as advertisements for the Special Broadcasting Service, Vizio televisions, and Idents for Channel V. Since October 2010, the song has been used in the Vodafone TV commercial in Germany. The song was also used in the 2011 films The Roommate and Hall Pass, as well as in episode 11 of season 6 of Entourage.

Track listings
Australian CD
"We Are the People" – 4:34
"We Are the People (Shazam remix)" – 5:44
"We Are the People (Sam La More remix)" – 7:32
"Walking on a Dream (Neon Neon mix)" – 3:50
"Walking on a Dream (Danger racing remix)" – 4:37

UK iTunes EP 1
"We Are the People" – 4:32
"We Are the People (Burns remix)" – 6:52
"We Are the People (The Golden Filter remix – UK edit)" – 6:57
"We Are the People (We Are the Cagedbaby mix – UK edit)" – 6:56
"We Are the People (Crazy P remix – UK edit)" – 6:49

UK iTunes EP 2
"We Are the People" – 4:32
"We Are the People (Wawa remix) [UK edit]" – 6:55
"We Are the People (The Shapeshifters vocal remix) [UK edit]" – 6:47
"We Are the People (Sam La More remix) [UK edit]" – 6:47
"We Are the People (Shazam remix)" – 5:44
"We Are the People (Style of Eye remix) [UK edit]" – 6:58

Charts

Weekly charts

Year-end charts

Certifications

Release history

References

2008 singles
2008 songs
Astralwerks singles
Capitol Records singles
Electronic rock songs
EMI Records singles
Empire of the Sun (band) songs
Music videos shot in Mexico
Number-one singles in Germany
Songs written by Luke Steele (musician)
Songs written by Nick Littlemore